Danijil Leonyidovics Szemko (born 17 May 2000) is a Hungarian ice dancer. With his skating partner, Mariia Ignateva, he is the 2022 CS Denis Ten Memorial Challenge bronze medalist, 2022 Jégvirág Cup champion, the 2021 Volvo Open Cup silver medalist, a two-time Santa Claus Cup silver medalist (2022–23), and a two-time Hungarian national champion (2022–23). 

With his former skating partner, Villő Marton, he is a three-time Hungarian junior national champion (2018–20) and competed in the final segment at two World Junior Championships (2018, 2020).

Personal life 
Szemko was born on 17 May 2000 in Odessa, Ukraine. He moved to Hungary in 2014 and became a Hungarian citizen in 2017. In 2021, he graduated from the National University of Ukraine on Physical Education and Sport and received the specialty of a coach in figure skating.

Danijil is interested in music, theater, and clowning art. He plays the guitar and harmonica, writes songs, and performs in underground musical groups of Budapest.

Career

Early career 
Szemko began skating in 2006. He previously competed with Yana Bardadym and Vera Gorodetskaia for his native Ukraine. Szemko teamed up with Villő Marton to represent Hungary in the 2015–16 season.

2015–2016 season 
Marton/Szemko made their international debut on the Junior Grand Prix series, finishing fifteenth in Latvia and eleventh in Croatia. They then finished thirteenth at the NRW Trophy and seventeenth at the Santa Claus Cup. At the 2016 Four National Championships, Marton/Szemko finished fifth overall and won the Hungarian junior silver medal behind Kimberly Wei and Illias Fourati. As a result, they were assigned to the 2016 World Junior Championships, where they finished twenty-third and did not qualify for the free dance.

2016–2017 season 
Marton/Szemko opened the season with a thirteenth-place finish at 2016 JGP France. They then finished twelfth at the NRW Trophy and seventh at the Open d'Andorra. An injury prevented the team from competing at Four National Championships and, therefore, from earning the 2017 World Junior Championships spot. Marton/Szemko recovered to win their first international medal at the 2017 Jégvirág Cup, earning silver behind Ukraine's Popova/Byelikov and ahead of Damulevičiūtė/Kizala of Lithuania. They ended their season with an eleventh-place finish at Bavarian Open.

2017–2018 season 
Marton/Szemko began the season with a fifteenth-place finish at JGP Austria and a ninth-place finish at JGP Croatia. They medaled at all but one of the events they competed at before the 2018 World Junior Championships, earning golds at the 2017 Halloween Cup and 2018 Jégvirág Cup, bronzes at the 2017 Leo Scheu Memorial and 2017 Open d'Andorra, and a ninth-place finish at the 2017 Santa Claus Cup.

Marton/Szemko won the 2018 Four National Championships ahead of the Czech Republic's Taschlerová/Taschler and Poland's Borysova/Zawadzki to earn their first junior national title. At the World Junior Championships, they were fifteenth in the short dance and twelfth in the free to finish fourteenth overall.

2018–2019 season 
Marton/Szemko started with a twelfth-place finish at JGP Slovenia and a thirteenth-place finish at JGP Armenia. The team finished tenth at Volvo Open Cup and earned silver at the Christmas Cup. Marton/Szemko won silver at the 2019 Four National Championships behind Taschlerová/Taschler but retained their Hungarian junior national title for a second consecutive season. At the 2019 World Junior Championships, they were twenty-third in the rhythm dance and did not advance to the free dance.

2019–2020 season 
Marton/Szemko opened the season with an eighth-place finish at JGP France and a fifteenth-place finish at JGP Croatia. They earned bronze at Open d'Andorra and finished fifth at Santa Claus Cup. Marton/Szemko again won silver behind Taschlerová/Taschler at the 2020 Four National Championships while retaining their Hungarian junior national title. The team finished eighth at 2020 Mentor Toruń Cup. At the 2020 World Junior Championships, Marton/Szemko were seventeenth in the rhythm dance but fell to nineteenth in the free dance and remained nineteenth overall.

2020–2021 season 
Marton/Szemko split prior to the 2020–21 season. In January 2021, coach Nóra Hoffmann announced Szemko's partnership with Russian Mariia Ignateva to compete for Hungary.

2021–2022 season 
Ignateva/Szemko made their international competitive debut at the 2021 CS Lombardia Trophy, where they placed seventeenth. They were then sixth at the Budapest Trophy before winning silver medals at the Volvo Open Cup and the Santa Claus Cup. At the 2022 Four National Championships, Ignateva/Szemko earned the bronze medal behind Poland's Kaliszek/Spodyriev and Taschlerová/Taschler of the Czech Republic, as well as the Hungarian national title. They were assigned to the 2022 European Championships, where they finished eighteenth overall. Ignateva/Szemko competed at the Jégvirág Cup in February and won their first international title together. They finished the season making the World Championship debut, finishing twenty-second.

2022–2023 season 
Beginning the season on the Challenger circuit, Ignateva/Szemko were eighth at the 2022 CS Nepela Memorial and seventh at the 2022 CS Budapest Trophy. They won the bronze medal at the 2022 CS Denis Ten Memorial Challenge, their first Challenger medal, and then repeated as silver medalists at the Santa Claus Cup. They finished second in the standings at the 2023 Four National Championships, behind only Czechs Taschlerová/Taschler, thus winning the Hungarian national title for a second consecutive year.

Ignateva/Szemko finished tenth at the 2023 European Championships.

Programs

With Ignateva

With Marton

Competitive highlights 
CS: Challenger Series; JGP: Junior Grand Prix

With Ignateva

With Marton

References

External links 
 
 
 

2000 births
Living people
Hungarian male ice dancers
Ukrainian male ice dancers
Sportspeople from Odesa
Ukrainian emigrants to Hungary
Naturalized citizens of Hungary